The 2004 World Women's Curling Championship (branded as 2004 Ford World Women's Curling Championship for sponsorship reasons) was held at the Gavlerinken in Gävle, Sweden from April 17–25, 2004. The tournament was held in conjunction with the 2004 World Men's Curling Championship and the 2004 World Senior Curling Championships. It was the last event held in conjunction with the men's tournament, the last to be held before the adoption of the page playoff system (before it was later replaced in 2018), and the last event to feature just ten teams. 

In the final, Canada's Colleen Jones rink won their second World Championship, defeating Norway's Dordi Nordby in the final, 8–4 in front of 1,500 spectators. Jones, who had won the silver medal in 2003 decided to opt for a more offensive strategy in 2004, which helped her success. She also greatly out-curled Nordby, 89% to 49%. 

Switzerland's Luzia Ebnöther won the bronze medal, defeating the US's Patti Lank rink in the third place game, 10–5.

Teams

Round robin standings

Round robin results

Draw 1
April 17, 2004 09:00

Draw 2
April 17, 2004 18:30

Draw 3
April 18, 2004 12:00

Draw 4
4/18/2004 20:00

Draw 5
April 19, 2004 14:00

Draw 6
April 20, 2004 08:30

Draw 7
April 20, 2004 19:00

Draw 8
April 21, 2004 14:00

Draw 9
April 22, 2004 08:30

Tiebreakers

Tiebreaker 1
April 22, 2004 17:00

Tiebreaker 2
April 23, 2004 09:00

Playoffs

Brackets

Semifinals
April 23, 2004 19:00

Bronze medal game
April 24, 2004 09:30

Gold medal game
April 24, 2004 17:30

Player percentages

References

Sources
 

Ford World Women's Curling Championship, 2004
Ford World Women's Curling Championship
World Women's Curling Championship
Sports competitions in Gävle
Women's curling competitions in Sweden
International curling competitions hosted by Sweden
April 2004 sports events in Europe